Planchonia brevistipitata grows as a small tree up to  tall. The bark is greyish to brown. The specific epithet brevistipitata is from the Latin meaning "short stalk", referring to the flowers and fruit. Habitat is riverine and lowland mixed dipterocarp forest. P. brevistipitata is endemic to Borneo.

References

brevistipitata
Endemic flora of Borneo
Trees of Borneo
Plants described in 1965